Toledo is a station on Line 1 of the Naples Metro, named after nearby Via Toledo. It won  the 2013 LEAF Award as "Public building of the year".

The station was opened on 17 April 2012 on the earlier completed section to Università.

See also
 Art Stations of the Naples Metro
 List of Naples metro stations
 List of metro systems

References

Naples Metro stations
2012 establishments in Italy
Quartieri Spagnoli
Railway stations opened in 2012
Railway stations in Italy opened in the 21st century